Aleh Yurenia (21 May 1990) is a Belarusian sprint canoeist who has competed since the late 2000s.

He has won six World Championships medals; one gold (K-1 5000 m: 2019), two silvers (K-1 1000 m: 2011, 2013) and three bronzes (K-1 1000 m: 2010, 2015, K-1 5000 m: 2017). In June 2015, he competed in the inaugural European Games, for Belarus in canoe sprint, more specifically, in the Men's K-4 1000m with Raman Piatrushenka, Pavel Miadzvedzeu, and Vitaliy Bialko. He earned a bronze medal.

References

External links

Belarusian male canoeists
Living people
1990 births
Canoeists at the 2012 Summer Olympics
Olympic canoeists of Belarus
ICF Canoe Sprint World Championships medalists in kayak
European Games medalists in canoeing
Canoeists at the 2015 European Games
European Games bronze medalists for Belarus
Canoeists at the 2019 European Games
People from Slonim
Canoeists at the 2020 Summer Olympics
Sportspeople from Grodno Region